Jane Chi (born June 21, 1974) is a former professional tennis player from the United States.

Early career 
Chi was born in El Paso, Texas, to parents Steven and Ling. At the age of 11 she started playing tennis and after graduating from high school in 1992 played collegially at the University of California, Los Angeles. She attended the university for three years, while studying for a political science degree, during which time he earned multiple All-American honors. Her regular doubles partner was younger sister Stephanie.

In 1994 she played internationally for Chinese Taipei, first in a Fed Cup World Group tie against Indonesia in Frankfurt, then at the Asian Games in Hiroshima, where she won a bronze medal in the team competition.

During the 1995 season, her last for UCLA, Chi was America's top ranked player in college tennis, ending with a No. 3 ranking.

Professional tennis
From 1995 she competed on the professional circuit. At the 1996 US Open she made her Grand Slam debut and reached the second round, with a win over María Sánchez Lorenzo. She was a semifinalist at the 1998 Challenge Bell, a WTA Tour tournament in Quebec City. Her run included an upset win over second seed Sandrine Testud. Her only other WTA Tour semifinal was at the Japan Open in 1999, a year in which she reached her career best ranking of 62 in the world, with second round appearances at both the Australian Open and US Open. After retiring from tennis she earned a Doctor of Law degree at the University of Idaho and now works in Seattle.

ITF finals

Singles (6–3)

Doubles (2–5)

References

External links
 
 
 

1974 births
Living people
American sportswomen of Chinese descent
American female tennis players
Taiwanese female tennis players
Asian Games bronze medalists for Chinese Taipei
Asian Games medalists in tennis
UCLA Bruins women's tennis players
University of Idaho alumni
Tennis people from Texas
Sportspeople from El Paso, Texas
American people of Taiwanese descent
Tennis players at the 1994 Asian Games
Medalists at the 1994 Asian Games